Mundos Opuestos or Mundos opuestos (English: "Opposite Worlds") may refer to:

Mundos opuestos (Mexican TV series), a 1976 Mexican telenovela
Mundos Opuestos (Chilean TV series), a 2012 Chilean reality television show
Mundos Opuestos (Colombian TV series), a 2012 Colombian version of the Chilean reality television show
Mundos Opuestos (album), a 2005 album by American Latin pop duo Ha*Ash

See also

  or 
 
 Opposite Worlds, a 2014 U.S. version of the Chilean reality television show